Cold shock domain-containing protein E1 is a protein that in humans is encoded by the CSDE1 gene.

References

External links

Further reading